Maikel Alejandro Reyes Azcuy (sometimes spelt as Maykel Reyes) is a Cuban international football player who plays for his local team Pinar del Río and the Cuba national team.

Club career
In January 2016, he became the first Cuban footballer (along with Abel Martínez) to sign for a foreign club with the approval of the Cuban government's Institute of Sports, Physical Education and Recreation (INDER), when he signed for Mexican club side Cruz Azul.

He returned to Cuba in 2017 to play for Villa Clara, only to join hometown side Pinar del Río in 2018.

International career
Reyes was involved in the unsuccessful campaign to qualify for the 2012 Summer Olympics football tournament playing against Canada in March 2012 in the Olympic qualifying tournament.

In 2013, he participated in the CONCACAF U-20 Championship and the FIFA U-20 World Cup. In November 2013, he represented Cuba in the 2014 Central American and Caribbean Games, scoring against Honduras and Costa Rica.

Reyes made his senior international debut in October 2012 against Panama. and has, as of January 2018, earned a total of 13 caps, scoring two goals.

Reyes was named in the team for the 2015 CONCACAF Gold Cup. On July 15, he scored the only goal against Guatemala in the group stage to make Cuba qualify to the quarter-finals.

International goals
Scores and results list Cuba's goal tally first.

References

External links
 
 

1993 births
Living people
Cuban footballers
Cuba international footballers
Cuba youth international footballers
Association football forwards
2015 CONCACAF Gold Cup players
Competitors at the 2014 Central American and Caribbean Games
Central American and Caribbean Games bronze medalists for Cuba
FC Pinar del Río players
FC Ciego de Ávila players
Cruz Azul Hidalgo footballers
FC Villa Clara players
Liga Premier de México players
Cuban expatriate footballers
Expatriate footballers in Mexico
Cuban expatriate sportspeople in Mexico
2019 CONCACAF Gold Cup players
People from Pinar del Río Province
Central American and Caribbean Games medalists in football